John Hildesley (c. 1598 – 20 January 1681) was an English politician who sat in the House of Commons  at various times between 1653 and 1660.

In 1653, Hildesley was nominated to represent Hampshire in the Barebones Parliament . He was elected Member of Parliament for Winchester in the First Protectorate Parliament, and was re-elected MP for Winchester in 1656 for the Second Protectorate Parliament and in 1659 for the Third Protectorate Parliament. 

In 1660, Hildesley was elected Member of Parliament for Christchurch in the Convention Parliament.
 
Hildesley married Margaret Tulse, widow  of Henry Tulse of Hinton Admiral. He was stepfather to  Henry Tulse who was MP for Christchurch with him in 1660.

References

 
 

1598 births
1681 deaths
Year of birth uncertain
Politicians from Winchester
Place of birth missing
English MPs 1653 (Barebones)
English MPs 1654–1655
English MPs 1656–1658
English MPs 1659
English MPs 1660